Winging  may refer to:

 Scapula winging, a condition in which the medial border of a person's scapula is abnormally positioned outward and backward
 Winging, a type of Aerodynamic Flight by which an object moves either through the air by using surfaces to produce lift
 Shovel-shaped incisors, a particular orientation of human teeth
 Wing foiling, a wind powered water sport

Or see
wikt:whinging